The Beembe (also Bembe, Babembe, Babeembe) are a Bantu people living in southern Congo-Brazzaville, precisely in Bouenza and in the cities of Brazzaville, Dolisie, and Pointe-Noire. It is a Kongo subgroup.
Beembe society is economically based on agriculture. This area, the Congo, was colonized by the French. The Beembe culture was not discovered until the later part of colonization and their artwork was not attributed to them until later.

Cultural traditions
Their social organisation is based on the matrimonial clan, whose members could live in several villages. The family unit generally included three generations. The chief in charge of the village, the nga-bula, mediated with the ancestors.

Hunting was the main activity; before leaving on a hunt, the leader would invoke the ancestral spirits, using as intermediaries statuettes kneeling in the position of a hunter waiting for his prey. The Bembe believed in a creator god, Nzambi, whom they did not depict figuratively. He was the master of the life and death – unless the latter was due to the act of a sorcerer, ndoki, who could magically “eat” the life force of clan members. The ancestors had close ties with the living and received offerings through the “priest” who made appeals to statuettes, the kitebi or bimbi, consecrated by the sorcerer. These figurines were the idealized images of the ancestors and would often wear attributes that allowed them to be identified as medicine men or hunters. The ancestor worship among the Bembe is older, though, and precedes the use of magic statues, nkisi, by the sorcerers.

Beembe figures
In terms of artistic practice, the Beembe have much in common with other Kongo groups, such as the use of nkisi figures. However, Beembe figures are the most distinctive form of Beembe sculpture. Beembe are meticulously carved ancestral figures rendered in idealized form. They display extensive geometric incisions representing scarification on their abdomens, and their eyes are inlaid with ceramic or shell shards. Beembe typically have a small cavity between their legs, into which medicinal substances were inserted; this practice endowed the figures with protective powers.

The figure usually is upright with knees slightly bent, its large feet with carefully articulated toes standing on the base; the seated position occurs less frequently. Female statuettes have a pronounced, almost square, chin, a large nose and mouth, finely sculpted ears, and hair carved in relief on the forehead. The hands of male sculptures’ are typically turned toward one another and are carrying implements that represent the ancestor's profession in life.

Bibliography

Decalo S., Thompson V. & Adloff R. 1984. Historical dictionary of Congo Pg 218-219. USA: The Scarecrow Press, Inc

References

Kongo
Ethnic groups in the Republic of the Congo